Ayeni  may refer to:

 Adekunle Ayeni, Nigerian public relations practitioner, journalist, trained scientist and businessman
 Bosun Ayeni, Nigerian footballer
 John Olatunde Ayeni (born 1967), Nigerian lawyer, investor and business magnate
 Kayode Ayeni (born 1987), American basketball player
 Phillip Ayeni, Navy Captain and first Administrator of Bayelsa State, Nigeria
 Tayo Ayeni, Nigerian businessman